is a former Japanese football player and manager.

Playing career
Nakao was born in Nagasaki Prefecture on June 8, 1969. After graduating from Osaka University of Commerce, he joined Japan Football League club Kawasaki Steel (later Vissel Kobe) in 1992. He played many matches as defender from first season. However his opportunity to play decreased from 1995. Although he could not play at all in the match in 1996, the club won the 2nd place and was promoted to J1 League from 1997. However he could not play many matches and left the club end of 1997 season. After that, he played for Sagawa Express Tokyo and Sagawa Express Osaka. In 2005, he moved to Sagawa Express Kyoto (later FC Mi-O Biwako Kusatsu) and became a playing manager. He retired end of 2007 season.

Coaching career
In 2005, Nakao became a playing manager for Regional Leagues club Sagawa Express Kyoto (later FC Mi-O Biwako Kusatsu, MIO Biwako Shiga).

Club statistics

References

External links

1969 births
Living people
Osaka University of Commerce alumni
Association football people from Nagasaki Prefecture
Japanese footballers
J1 League players
Japan Football League (1992–1998) players
Vissel Kobe players
Japanese football managers
Association football defenders